Lloyd Averall Letherby (July 27, 1900 – January 4, 1968) was a politician in Ontario, Canada. He was a Progressive Conservative member of the Legislative Assembly of Ontario from 1954 to 1967 who represented the central Ontario riding of Simcoe East.

Background
Letherby was born in Midland, Ontario. He went to school there and graduated from high school. After school he worked in a number of occupations including travelling salesman, grocery store owner, newspaper editor and insurance and real estate broker. He lived in Coldwater, Ontario where he and his wife raised one son.

Politics
In 1935 he was elected reeve of Coldwater, Ontario. He stayed in that role until 1954 when he was elected in a by-election called to fill the vacancy created by the death of the PC MPP, John Duncan McPhee. He defeated W.L. Moore (Liberal) and Wilfred Hoult (CCF) to win the riding. He was re-elected in 1955, 1959 and 1963. He retired in 1967 citing poor health.

He died in Orillia at the Soldiers' Memorial Hospital after suffering a heart attack. He was buried in Coldwater.

References

External links 
 

1900 births
1968 deaths
People from Midland, Ontario
Progressive Conservative Party of Ontario MPPs